Bulbostylis barbata is a flowering plant in the sedge family, Cyperaceae, that is native to Western Australia.

It blooms between February to September producing brown flowers.

It is rarely solitary and is found in rock crevices and along creek and rivers and on low-lying flats throughout a large area of the Kimberley, Pilbara, Mid West and Goldfields-Esperance regions where it grows in sandy-loamy alluvium over sandstone and granite.

References

barbata
Plants described in 1893
Angiosperms of Western Australia